Odd Hammernes (born 28 September 1948) is a Norwegian former ski jumper. He was born in Asker and represented the club Asker SK. He competed at the 1976 Winter Olympics in Innsbruck.

References

External links

1948 births
Living people
People from Asker
Norwegian male ski jumpers
Olympic ski jumpers of Norway
Ski jumpers at the 1976 Winter Olympics
Sportspeople from Viken (county)